Confederate Soldier Monument in Lexington, in Lexington Cemetery in Lexington, Kentucky, was placed on the National Register of Historic Places on July 17, 1997, as part of the Civil War Monuments of Kentucky MPS.

Close to the Monument is the Ladies' Confederate Memorial, also part of the Civil War Monuments of Kentucky MPS.  Four residents of Lexington with means funded the construction of the monuments, buying a statue built in Carrara, Italy from a catalog, and in 1893 was erected by the Muldoon Monument Company.  The names of 160 veterans of the Confederate Army are inscribed on the monolith.

References

Civil War Monuments of Kentucky MPS
Lexington in the American Civil War
National Register of Historic Places in Lexington, Kentucky
Confederate States of America monuments and memorials in Kentucky
Outdoor sculptures in Kentucky
1893 sculptures
1893 establishments in Kentucky